The 2002–03 season was Juventus Football Club's 105th in existence and 101st consecutive season in the top flight of Italian football.

Juventus enjoyed much success, with Marcello Lippi guiding the team to the Serie A title for the second season in a row, finishing seven points ahead of Inter and 11 in front of A.C. Milan and, in Europe, reaching the Champions League Final after eliminating powerhouses like Real Madrid en route. In the all-Italian final, Juventus faced Milan and were beaten in a penalty shoot-out after a goalless draw. It was the fourth time that Lippi had led Juventus to the Champions League final (winning in 1996 but losing in 1997 and 1998).

Lippi employed the 4–3–1–2 formation for most of the season, with Pavel Nedvěd in the role of trequartista instead of his usual left midfield position. Nedvěd had one of the best seasons of his career and was awarded the 2003 Ballon d'Or in the wake of his performances. Unfortunately for the club, he was ruled out of the Champions League final after receiving a yellow card in the second leg of the semi-final against Real Madrid, and his absence would be greatly felt.

Players

Squad information

Transfers

Left club during season

Season review
On the field, the side coached by Marcello Lippi had a relatively slow start to the league season. They remained unbeaten in the first 12 matches, but this included five draws. The club's form suffered a blip at the beginning of autumn with two draws and two consecutive defeats, to Brescia and Lazio, between 23 November and 15 December. At this point of the season, with 14 matches played, Juventus were fourth in Serie A, trailing Inter, Lazio and Milan. On 22 December, a late Mauro Camoranesi goal at Perugia was needed to put an end to this winless streak.

From this moment on, the Bianconeri gained a momentum they sustained going into the new year, winning nine of their next ten matches. Unfortunately, the only fixture they failed to win during this period, a 1–1 draw against Atalanta in early February, was marred by a serious injury to Alessandro Del Piero, at a time when he had rediscovered his goalscoring touch. Del Piero subsequently missed two months of football. Even in his absence, la Vecchia Signora continued to prevail, though in a less dominant fashion. On 2 March, Juventus thrashed Inter 3–0, a result that took the club to top spot in the league, a position it would never leave. After the match, the Bianconeri lost only two more of their remaining matches and won most of the remainder, including an important success over Roma, who had been something of a bogey side for the Turin club in previous years.

The 27th league title of Juve's history was confirmed on 10 May following a 2–2 draw with Perugia — with two matches to play, second-placed Inter were no longer in a position to challenge for the Scudetto.

Europe
All three North Italian clubs succeeded in Europe. Along with the two Milan clubs, Juventus were one of the three Italian sides who appeared in the semi-finals that season. Juventus eliminated the only remaining non-Italian team, Real Madrid, to set up an all-Italian final with Milan, who had beaten Inter in the other semi-final. The final, played at Old Trafford in Manchester, ended 0–0 with Milan winning on penalties. Normally reliable goalscorer David Trezeguet was among the players who missed their attempts.

It was Juventus' best run in the competition since the 1997–98 season, where they had also been beaten finalists. However, the Bianconeri'''s run to the final actually involved a lot of tough moments. After impressing in the first group stage, topping their group (which included Feyenoord, Dynamo Kyiv and Newcastle United) and conceding just three goals in six matches (the best defence of all 32 teams competing), Juventus struggled in the second group stage.

Drawn in Group D alongside Basel, Deportivo La Coruña and Manchester United, Juventus were beaten by Manchester United both at Old Trafford and at home at the Stadio delle Alpi and also lost to Basel in Switzerland. Eventually, they scraped by as group runners-up behind Manchester United. 

More epic games awaited them, with Barcelona next on their agenda. While struggling in their domestic league, Barcelona had impressed in both group stages, topping their group every time and establishing a new record of nine consecutive wins in the competition. The first leg of the quarter-final in Turin finished 1–1, Javier Saviola's 78th-minute goal equalising Paolo Montero's early goal. Barcelona appeared to be in a fine position heading into the second leg at the Camp Nou. There, Pavel Nedvěd scored first for Juventus, but the Catalans soon equalised through Xavi. When Edgar Davids was sent-off for repeated fouling, the Bianconeri'' were seemingly doomed. However, ten-man Juventus held on until extra time, and with six minutes left on the clock, substitute Marcelo Zalayeta scored a second goal to advance the club to the semi-finals.

Even tougher opposition was awaiting them in the following round in Real Madrid. Madrid had won three of the previous five editions of the competition and presented a star-studded squad with players such as Iker Casillas, Roberto Carlos, Luís Figo, Raúl, Ronaldo and former Juventus playmaker Zinedine Zidane. They had imperiously seen off the challenge of Manchester United in the quarter-finals and were in search of their tenth European Cup/Champions League title.

The first leg was played in Madrid on 6 May. Real Madrid scored with Ronaldo, but David Trezeguet equalised. The second half saw Roberto Carlos grab a second goal for the home side.

In the return leg on 14 May, Juventus set out to attack and were rewarded for their efforts with just 12 minutes gone. A fine collective move saw Gianluca Zambrotta cross from deep for Alessandro Del Piero, who headed back into the six-yard box for David Trezeguet to smash home. Just before half-time, Del Piero beat goalkeeper Casillas at his near post with a well-placed shot. Del Piero thus maintained his tradition of scoring key goals against Real Madrid, having already done so as a 21-year-old in a 1996 quarter-final tie.

Real Madrid earned a penalty after 65 minutes, but Gianluigi Buffon saved Luís Figo's effort, thus keeping his side's two-goal advantage. On 73 minutes, Pavel Nedvěd made it 3–0, but he received a yellow card for a rash challenge in the closing minutes of the match, meaning he would miss the final through suspension. On 89 minutes, Zidane, playing on the pitch which had been his home for five seasons, pulled one back for Real Madrid. The match ended 3–1 as Juventus qualified for the final.

Key players
For the league title, Nedvěd was considered the key player, also winning the European Player of the Year award. With five goals scored, he was — alongside Alessandro Del Piero — the club's joint top goalscorer in the Champions League.

Gianluigi Buffon, Lilian Thuram, Ciro Ferrara, Edgar Davids and Alessandro Del Piero all made key contributions to the squad, but the biggest surprise was Mauro Camoranesi. Signed from Hellas Verona in the summer of 2002, the Argentinian-born midfielder adapted with ease to his new surroundings and was one of the club's best players for the first seven months of the season. In April and May 2003, he suffered from a slight loss of form which did not change the fact that he had significantly contributed to a positive season for the club.

2001–02 topscorer David Trezeguet suffered from a knee injury in pre-season practice. He recovered strongly from this setback, but his absence gave the opportunity to Marcelo Zalayeta and Marco Di Vaio to play more matches than would be expected, with Zalayeta in particular scoring some key goals.

Competitions

Supercoppa Italiana

Serie A

League table

Results summary

Results by round

Matches

Coppa Italia

Round of 16

Quarter-finals

UEFA Champions League

Group stage

Second group stage

Knockout stage

Quarter-finals

Semi-finals

Final

Statistics

Appearances and goals in the Serie A

Overall statistics

References

Juventus F.C. seasons
Juventus
Italian football championship-winning seasons